The Somatic Defilement is the debut studio album by American deathcore band Whitechapel. The album was released on July 31, 2007, through Candlelight Records and is their only release through this label before their move to Metal Blade the following year. It is the only album to feature guitarist Brandon Cagle.

Overview
The Somatic Defilement is mostly a concept album based on Jack the Ripper, in which the majority of the songs are first-person narratives of the slaughter and rape of prostitutes. Only two songs are exceptions to this theme: vocalist Phil Bozeman specified that "Alone in the Morgue" is about "a coroner who is a demented necrophiliac" and "Festering Fiesta" is about Jeffrey Dahmer. The intro track, "Necrotizing" also contains excerpts from a Stone Phillips interview with Dahmer.

The album is the only one by Whitechapel to include Brandon Cagle as guitarist. He later left the band, because the injuries he received from a motorcycle accident left him unable to play his instrument. He was replaced by Zach Householder.

Reissue
A remixed and remastered edition of the album was released on April 16, 2013 through Metal Blade Records. Re-mixing and re-mastering duties were given to Mark Lewis, whom the band worked with since their self-titled release.

Track listing

Personnel 
Whitechapel
Phil Bozeman – vocals
Ben Savage – guitar
Brandon Cagle –  guitar
Alex Wade –  guitar
Gabe Crisp – bass
Kevin Lane – drums
Production
Production by Miah Lajeunesse and Whitechapel 
Mixing and engineering by Miah Lajeunesse 
Mastering by Alan Douches 
A&R by Jamie Graham

References

2007 debut albums
Whitechapel (band) albums
Candlelight Records albums
Metal Blade Records albums
Concept albums
Cultural depictions of Jack the Ripper